Karl Öhman is a retired Swedish bandy player and footballer. As a bandy player, Öhman was part of the Djurgården Swedish champions' team of 1908 and 1912. As a footballer, Öhman made 29 Svenska Serien appearances for Djurgården and scored 8 goals.

References

Swedish bandy players
Swedish footballers
Djurgårdens IF Bandy players
Djurgårdens IF Fotboll players
Svenska Serien players
Association footballers not categorized by position
Year of birth missing